Palahartari is a village in Kamrup, situated in south bank of Brahmaputra river.

Transport
Palahartari is accessible through National Highway 37. All major private commercial vehicles ply between Palahartari and nearby towns.

See also
 Panikhaiti
 Panitema

References

Villages in Kamrup district